A kuchkabal (kuchkabalo'ob,  'province'), also known as an ah kuch-kab or ah cuch-cab, was a system of social and political organisation common to Maya polities of the Maya Lowlands, in the Yucatán Peninsula, during the Mesoamerican Postclassic. There were somewhere between 16 and 24 kuchkabalo'ob in the 16th century. Kuchkabal may also refer to a ruling family.

Extent 

The kuchkabalo'ob were located in Maya Lowlands of the Yucatán Peninsula, bounded by a northwest-to-southeast trending crescent, stretching along the base of the Peninsula, from the Bay of Campeche to the Bay of Honduras. To the west, the kuchkabalo'ob bordered settlements of Chontal, Nahuatl, and Zoque speakers in eastern Tabasco, eastern Chiapas, and western Campeche (beyond Laguna de Terminos). To the southwest and south, they bordered settlements of Chol speakers in western Peten, northern Alta Verapaz, northern Izabal, northern Copan, northern Santa Barbara, and western Cortes (before the Ulua River). The kuchkabalo'ob thereby encompassed all six districts of Belize, the Guatemalan department of Peten, and the Mexican states of Campeche, Quintana Roo, and Yucatán.

Some recent scholarship, employing a revised understanding of the kuchkabalo'ob, has proposed to situate the latter only within those portions of the Lowlands predominated by Yucatecan Mayan speakers. Consequently, the limits of the kuchkabalo'ob's territory have been proposed as a northwest-to-southeast trending diagonal, from Champoton to the Belize River, resulting in an expanse covering only the aforementioned Mexican states, and the Belizean districts of Corozal, Orange Walk, and Belize.

History

Emergence 
Current knowledge of the historical antecedents of the kuchkabalo'ob 'is fragmentary and extremely vague for the period prior to the middle of the fifteenth century.' Nonetheless, some post-conquest Maya accounts claim 'Chichen Itza had formerly governed the entire country [Peninsula] for about 200 years,' while other such accounts rather claim 'that Uxmal, Chichen Itza, and Mayapan ruled the area during this length of time,' and furthermore, some such accounts claim that Mayapan ruled the Peninsula during a later period. The former claim has been described as 'more or less true of most of northern Yucatán [Peninsula],' while the last claim has been deemed partially accurate, as there is 'some evidence that northern Yucatán from the Gulf of Mexico east to Cupul was, for a time at least, subject to a joint government located at [Mayapan, though] it is doubtful that its hegemony included Campeche and Champoton [and, further,] it appears possible that it did not extend to the east coast of the peninsula.' In case such a centralised government existed at Mayapan, its rule would have been disrupted upon the city's destruction 'about a century before the final Spanish conquest.' It has been further suggested that Nahuatl- or Chontal-speaking settlers, who appear to have come predominantly from Tabasco, may have influenced the constitutions of emerging kuchkabalo'ob.

Rebellion and war against the Cocom 

Since AD 987, when the Toltecs went into decline, the League of Mayapan had been the main power in Yucatán. In 1441 the league had a civil war between the Cocom and Tutul Xiues. The rest of the league took advantage of the war and rebelled. By 1461 the League of Mayapan had been completely disintegrated into seventeen Kuchkabals. At the time of the breakup of the League of Mayapan in 1441 there were seventeen kuchabalo'ob: Ekab, Chakan Putum, Ah Canul, Ceh Pech, Tutul-Xiu, Sotuta, Hocaba, Chakan, Ah Kin Chel, Cupul, Tazes, Chikinchel, Uaymil, Chetumal, Cochuah, Can Pech, and Calotmul. Calotmul was conquered by the Tutul-Xiues. A year after the Spanish conquest in 1547, the Mayas rebelled and formed a kuchkabal in the north east of Yucatán. Its capital was Zaci in Cupul.

Other nations declared independence during this time and before. They were Tabasco, Acalan, Yalain, Kowoj, the Itza Kingdom, Mopan, Kejache, Cocom, and Ch'orti'.

Fall 

Hispano-Maya hostilities first broke out in Ecab, capital of the eponymous kuchkabal in Cape Catoche, in 1517. The Spanish conquest, however, did not properly start until 1527, and was 'an arduous enterprise lasting twenty years.'

Constitution 
The kuchkabalo'ob were divided into municipalities called batalib (plural batalibo'ob), and each batalib was ruled by a batab (plural batabo'ob). The ruler of a kuchkabal was called a halach winik (lit. "real man"). A halach winik was a monarch, but some kuchkabalo'ob were oligarchies, with batabil having a seat on a senate. As in the case of Ekab one batalib usually had more powerful batabo'ob. The batabo'ob were normally related to the halach winik.

Types 
Many of the kuchkabalo'ob were organised as unitary states, governed by a single halach winik. However, some were rather organised as a confederacy of batabilo'ob, 'more or less closely knit,' and governed by various batabo'ob. And further still, some 'seem to have been merely collections of towns in a given area, whose relations with one another are largely a matter of conjecture.'

Divisions 
The kuchkabalo'ob were first subdivided into constituent batabilo'ob or towns. Larger towns were further subdivided into kuchteelo'ob or wards, though 'little' is known about these second-order units. Consequently, the civil service of all kuchkabalo'ob featured offices for first-order units (batabilo'ob), while that of at least some kuchkabalo'ob further featured offices for zeroth-order (kuchkabalo'ob) or second-order units (kuchteelo'ob).

Offices

Halach winik 

The halach winik, present in some, but not all, kuchkabalo'ob, exercised sovereign legislative, executive, judicial, military, and religious authority over the kuchkabal. Their government is thought to have been invariably based in the capital. Notably, the office was responsible for military defence, foreign policy, home policy (effected via batabo'ob), serious or inter-municipal civil and criminal court cases, and certain religious ceremonies. Particular attention is thought to have been paid to the maintenance of the territorial integrity of the kuchkabal, and that of its constituent towns. For instance, in 1545, Nachi Cocom, colonial halach winik of Sotuta, is known to have 'personally made a survey of his entire frontier and conferred with various Cochua and Cupul [batabo'ob] who lived close to his borders, evidently discussing local differences of opinion in regard to the frontiers.' Similarly, in 1557, Kukum Xiu (also known as Francisco the Montejo Xiu), colonial halach winik of Mani, held a conference at Mani (city) for his and neighbouring batabo'ob to determine the limits of the kuchkabal and its constituent towns.

The office, at least in some kuchkabalo'ob, is known to have been the prerogative of the leading noble house, with tenure held for life, and passed from father to first-born son. The officeholder is thought to have been entitled to an allottment of slaves, annual tribute from each town and household (typically produce or other merchantable goods), and court fees when acting as justice. Said remuneration is thought to have been 'sufficient [...] to live in considerable state.' The officeholder is, additionally, thought to have acted as batab of the kuchkabal's capital, and been entitled to that office's remuneration.

The halach winik does not seem to have had a dedicated provincial council, though it has been suggested that either senior officers of the capital, or some of the batabo'ob from other towns (especially those related to the halach winik), may have acted in such a capacity, being 'consulted on provincial affairs.'

Batab 

The batab, present in all kuchkabalo'ob, exercised executive, judicial, and military authority over a batabil or settlement. Notably, the office was responsible for military defence, the building code, farming regulations, non-serious or intra-municipal civil and criminal court cases, and for executing the halach winik's home policy. However, the office's authority is thought to have varied across kuchkabalo'ob.

In kuchkabalo'ob with a halach winik, relatives of the latter are thought to have enjoyed precedence for the office of batab, as the halach winik held the power of appointment to said office in such provinces. Additionally, suitable first-born sons of an outgoing batab are similarly thought to have enjoyed precedence for office. In kuchkabalo'ob without a halach winik, the batab office's rules of succession are thought to have been similar to those for the office of the halach winik. The officeholder is thought to have been entitled to annual tribute from each household (in kuchkabalo'ob without a halach winik) or to a farm and to miscellaneous farming-and-residential services (in kuchkabalo'ob with a halach winik), and court fees when acting as justice (in either case). Furthermore, the officeholder is thought to have been 'treated with great ceremony and attended by many people' both at home and abroad. For instance, it is thought to have been customary, during lay celebrations, for the town's residents to attend to the batab, 'bowing before him [the batab], opening a lane for him to pass, [...] spreading their mantles in front of him [and] protect[ing] his head from the sun with great fans of bright feathers.'

The batab does seem to have had a dedicated town council, constituted of kulelo'ob, who assumed both personal and official functions, like attending to the batab at their personal residence, conveying official instructions to town residents, and acting as advocates in court. Other auxiliary offices included the kuch kab and hol pop (for civil affairs) and the nakom (for military affairs).

Kuch kab 
The kuch kab, present in all kuchkabalo'ob, were senior members of the town council who reviewed the batab's instructions for either assent or dissent, with the former thought constitutionally necessary for the execution of any such instruction. In kuchkabalo'ob without a halach winik, the kuch kabo'ob are thought to have constituted 'the chief check' on the batab's authority. In larger towns which were further subdivided into wards, each such ward was assigned to a kuch kab, who was further tasked with taxation and 'other municipal affairs' within said ward. In at least some kuchkabalo'ob, officeholders were appointed by the batab, and tended to be 'rich and capable' men.

Kulel 
The kulel, present in all kuchkabalo'ob, were junior members of the town council who assisted and deputised for the batab, in both private and official capacities, by attending to the batab at their personal residence, conveying official instructions to town residents, and acting as advocates in court. The office is known to have 'definitely ranked below' that of the kuch kab.

Nakom 
The nakom, present in at least some kuchkabalo'ob, were 'special' war officers, thought to have held joint (with the batab) command of the town's troops during times of war. Officeholders were 'installed in office with great ceremony,' held tenure for three years, and maintained a demanding social and dietary regimen. For instance, while in office, the nakom was required to '[eat] no meat but the flesh of fish and inguanas, [...] never [be] intoxicated, remai[n] continent, and [have] little intercourse with his fellow townsmen.' Officeholders are thought to have 'probably had much influence in declaring war, for persons who had suffered injury away from home came to him to complain and seek revenge.' Notably, Nacahun Noh, a nakom of Saci, is known to have 'received gifts of shell beads from people living as far away as Tizimin who wished to conciliate him and avoid war with his town.'

Hol pop 
The hol pop, present in at least some kuchkabalo'ob, is thought to have been responsible for the popol na, a town hall where residents 'assemble[d] to discuss public business and [to] learn to dance for the town festivals,' and which is thought to have housed the town's pop, a ceremonial rug which served as 'a symbol of authority.' Notably, in at least some batabilo'ob, an hol pop is known to have discharged the office of batab.

Tupil 
The tupil, present in at least some kuchkabalo'ob, is thought to have exercised law enforcement authority, similar to that of a Spanish alguacil or 'minor peace officer.' The tupilo'ob are known to have been the lowest-ranked civil servants, with the office described as '[e]vidently [...] not a position filled by members of the nobility.' At least some officeholders are known to have rendered menial service to senior civil servants, for instance, by serving as provision carriers during trips by halach winik, or by maintaining the town's grain stores.

Holkan 
The holkan, present in at least some kuchkabalo'ob, is thought to have been a wartime office, responsible for xx, and responding to the batabil's troop's joint commanding officers, the batab and nakom. The holkano'ob were selected from among the troops for extraordinary military merit by the nakom, and were remunerated only during wartime, partly from the nakom's personal funds, and party from town funds. There were additionally entitled to spoils of war, and to 'a certain licence,' for a period upon their return from a campaign, to service and entertainment from the town's residents, often to the latter's 'annoyance.'

Clerical 
It has been suggested that priests 'should probably also be considered members of the town government.' For instance, the prophecies or interpretations of the chila'no'ob, routinely used to determine matters of state and economics, are further deemed to have 'evidently [been] an important factor in the reception accorded to the Spaniards in the various [kuchkabalo'ob].' Furthermore, in colonial times, when the Franciscans, Inquisition, and Provisorato de Indios, had 'more or less broken down' the pre-Columbian priesthood, caciques (ie batabo'ob) and 'other important men' are known to have assumed the office of chila'n. Similarly, chilan and non-chila'n priests are thought to 'have had more authority than the temporal rulers' when enforcing religious observances or punishing religious delinquency.

Post-conquest records do not provide evidence of centralised ecclesiastic organisation in any of the kuchkabalo'ob. Nonetheless, it has been suggested that 'most probabl[y, ...] something of the sort existed.' Particularly, in kuchkabalo'ob with a halach winik, it is thought that this officeholder may have assumed those duties of the earlier ahaw kan office in Mayapan, including the examination of candidates for priesthood, and the appointment and investment in office of priests for the kuchkabal's towns. In kuchkabalo'ob without a halach winik, ecclesiastic affairs 'may have been purely a local matter.'

The clergy do not seem to have been entitled to tithes. Rather, they are thought to have been compensated by voluntary offerings (of provisions, currency, or miscellaneous goods), or by regular fees for religious services.

Authority

Judicial 
The kuchkabalo'ob are thought to have only held courts of original jurisdiction, with all judgments deemed final and thus not subject to appeal. The batabo'ob held original civil and criminal jurisdiction for non-'serious' or intra-municipal claims, while the halach winik held such jurisdiction for 'serious' or inter-municipal ones. Judicial proceedings were presided over and decided by the batab or halach winik, with their deputies or kulelo'ob serving as advocates for the claimants, and further officers serving various court roles. Notably, court proceedings seem to have included only oral arguments, judgments seem to have been final in all cases, and oaths for sworn testimony seem to have 'consisted in calling down misfortunes on one's own head if a [given] statement were false.' Civil claims were brought 'for injuries committed without malice,' including, for instance, manslaughter, negligence, and 'the provocation by a husband or wife resulting in the suicide of the other spouse.' At least for cases of manslaughter, if court-awarded compensation were not settled, it seems that the claimant's family were authorised to summarily execute the defaulting defendant by ambush, though this is thought to have been rarely necessary. Criminal cases were brought for, among other crimes, murder, arson, adultery, and theft. Criminal sentences are thought to have included primarily death or enslavement, as milder sentences (e.g. flogging or imprisonment) do not seem to have been commonly employed. Nonetheless, leniency might be shown to youth, women, and members of the upper classes. Court fees, consisting of 'customary gifts,' were paid by litigants and petitioners ot the presiding justice.

Military 
The kuchkabalo'ob are thought to have been 'constantly at war with one another,' success in war being a principal source of the nobility's claim to authority, and of the economy's enslaved labour. The halach winik led the kuchkabal's troops as commander in chief. These were organised according to their batabil of origin, with the corresponding batab and nakom as joint commanding officers, and the holkano'ob as special forces. Wars are thought to have typically been short battles, waged during daytime in the wet season (specifically, between October and January, 'when there was little or no agricultural activity'), and to have typically occurred on inter-provincial causeways.

War parties, lead by the batab and nakom, often 'set out quietly, hoping for a surprise attack.' Parties were preceded by scouts, who 'blew whistles and conch shells, beat their wooden drums, and pounded large tortoise shells with deerhorn sticks' upon locating the enemy. Hand-to-hand combat ensued, to the tune of 'war cries and loud insults [...] often of an obscene character.' The battle's primary aim was usually the enemy's captivity, with prisoners being 'bound to a wooden collar or yoke, to which a longer rope was attached,' and thereby lead to their captors' batabil. Additionally, if the batab or nakom were slain in battle, the losing side would 'sl[i]ng their shields on their backs and retrea[t],' with the winning side's soldier responsible for the death being 'especially honoured' for their feat.

As surprise assaults were common, a town's defences typically included seasonal sentinels stationed at various border sites. Furthermore, as parties typically advanced along causeways, these were barricaded 'at strategic points [by semicircular, camouflaged] walls of dry stone and palisades of heavy timbers bound together by lianas, [with built-in defensive posts] from which arrows could be shot and darts, spears, and stones could be hurled at the approaching enemy.' Additionally, some batabilo'ob were further fortified by dry stone walls, ramparts, ditches, and even agave hedges. Furthermore, though there is 'no direct evidence of military alliances' among any of the kuchkabalo'ob prior to Spanish conquest, 'there can be little doubt that such existed,' for instance, between Cupul, Cochuah, and Sotuta, during their allied assault on Spanish forces at Merida in 1542. There is also some evidence of extra-regional military alliance, for instance, between Chetumal and the [non-kuchkabal] settlements on the Ulua River, as '[a]fter the Spaniards were driven out of Chetumal [...], an expedition of fifty war canoes from this [kuchkabal] came to assist the natives living on the Ulua River in Honduras in their resistance to the Spanish invaders there.' Similar alliances have been proposed between some kuchkabalo'ob in the southwestern portion of the Peninsula, and [non-kuchkabal] settlements in Tabasco.

Spiritual 
Religious functions are thought to have formed an important part of the duties discharged by senior civil servants across the kuchkabalo'ob. For instance, '[m]any important ceremonies were not performed at the temple, but in the private oratory of the batab or some other wealthy person of high rank.' Furthermore, some or many nobles or senior civil servants purported to hold exclusive favour with certain gods, especially Kukulkan, such that offerings to said gods could not be made directly, but rather required the intercession of one such noble or office holder. For instance, both office-holding nobles and priests presided over a pan-regional, annual, five-day festival to Kukulkan at Mani, where the god was worshipped 'with unusual pomp and ceremony, since he was the special patron of these warlike rulers.'

At least some religious ceremonies are thought to have incorporated state functions. For instance, year's-end ceremonies for the coming year, presided over by clergy at temples, and described as 'perhaps the most important [of the various recurring religious rites],' are known to have involved '[e]laborate formalities [...] in dismissing the old [civil service] incumbents and installing the new in office.'

Rights

To land 
The system of land tenure employed across the kuchkabalo'ob has not been fully elucidated. The system is commonly described as 'communal ownership,' following accounts by Gaspar Antonio Chi. Details regarding the purported 'communal ownership' are still debated, however, though it is nonetheless commonly agreed that 'there was no private ownership of land in the Spanish sense of the term.' In particular, there is evidence '[v]ery early in the colonial period [...] of both individual and municipal ownership of land.' For instance, a deed of sale dated 1561 records 'an individual title to a tract of land and its conveyance "to the principal men of the town here at Ebtun,"' with the vendor further noting that the conveyed title 'is the "title of the forest of my ancestors."' Similarly, at least some majority-Maya colonial towns are known to have held joint ownership over land within town limits, with town lots owned by the municipality, but fruit trees in orchards (and possibly, similar improvements to land) owned privately.

Society

Classes 
A tri-partite first-order horizontal subdivision, into nobles, commoners, and slaves, is commonly given for societies across the kuchkabalo'ob. Second-order horizontal subdivisions are also likely. For instance, commoners seem 'to have had an upper and a lower fringe,' though there is 'little information' regarding these. Additionally, however, a multi-partite first-order vertical subdivision, into various ch'ibalo'ob or genealogical lineages or houses, is also given for such societies. Such lineages or houses, which cut across the nobility and commons, are thought to have 'contributed greatly to social solidarity,' as members 'of the same patronymic considered themselves to be of the same kin and treated one another as such.' Each such lineage or house is thought to have had its own patron deity, and its own codex recording genealogy, membership, and related matters.

Nobility 
The almeheno'ob or nobles 'constituted the ruling class, filled the more important political offices, and were not only the most valiant warriers and members of the military orders but also the wealthiest farmers and merchants.' As many, if not all, priests are thought to have belonged to the nobility, such that the nobility subsumed civil, military, economic, and religious leaders, this social class is thought to have 'control[led] most fields of human activity.' Noble families were known for paying 'much attention to their genealogy,' particularly is this could be traced to the nobility of Mayapan. Such families were further thought to have 'had a secret lore handed down from father to son, a sort of ritual in which many words had a concealed meaning not understood by any except the initiates[, the knowledge of which] was an important evidence of noble descent.'

Commons 
The commoners, who 'made up the vast majority of the population,' were 'the free workers [...], including the artisans, fishermen, and small farmers and merchants generally.' The commons seem to have been further subdivided into upper, middle, and lower 'fringes,' the former consisting of wealthier commoners, the middle fringe of poorer commoners, and the lower fringe of serfs. Commoners, particularly wealthier ones, are thought to have enjoyed some, albeit limited, esteem and agency. For instance, at least in some kuchkabalo'ob, they are thought to have held non-noble titles. Furthermore, at least in some kuchkabalo'ob, they are thought to have enjoyed pre-eminence in official tables of precedence, and their relatives are thought to have been eligible for the civil service via a standardised exam.

Slaves 
The slaves 'most of [whom belonged] to the nobles or wealthy commoners,' were men, women, and children of the commons of settlements outside the kuchkabal who had been captured during battle. Indeed, it is thought that one of the principal motivations for war 'was the desire to capture slaves.' Slaves were traded within and between kuchkabalo'ob, as 'a large slave traffic existed.' Male slaves were typically employed for heavy manual labour in agriculture, fisheries, construction, and trade, while female slaves were typically employed in domestic service. They are thought to have been 'subjected to severity and harshness, and frequently sacrified at [...] religious festivals.' For instance, skeletal remains of several sacrificial victims recovered from the Sacred Cenote 'revealed some indications of malnutrition and definite evidence of abuse for a considerable period prior to death.'

Economy

Trade 
The kuchkabalo'ob's merchants are commonly thought to have been 'central participants' in the flourishing Mesoamerican maritime and overland commerce, providing both goods and shipping facilities to a trade network stretching from the Aztec Triple Alliance to northern Honduras (at least) or Panama (at most). The coastal capitals of the Ecab, Chikinchel, Cozumel, and Chetumal provinces are thought to have served as principal trans-shipment hubs for 'immense canoes' loaded with salt, textiles, honey, flint, and feathers for export, or metals, cacao, precious stones, obsidian, and pelts for import.

List 
Not all Postclassic Maya states or polities in the Lowlands, or even within the Yucatán Peninsula, are deemed kuchkabalo'ob by scholars.  Additionally, there is much disagreement regarding which polities did nor did not constitute a kuchkabal, and regarding details of their constitution, extent, organisation, and related matters. The accompanying table lists all entities recognised as Postclassic Maya states or polities in the Lowlands, and, for each, indicates whether these have or have not been considered a kuchkabal.

Table

Legacy

Social 
Upon conquest, the newly established Province of Yucatán 'not only allowed [the kuchkabalo'ob's nobility] to survive, but gave it definite and even liberal encouragement,' at least within encomienda, reduccion, and mision settlements. The pre-Columbian nobility, and by extension, some or large parts of the institutions and offices they formerly held, were preserved in colonial times by confirmation of noble status, precedence for local civil and military offices, and grants of special privileges. For instance, the noble house of Xiu, of Mani, were routinely confirmed 'the rights, privileges, and exemptions hereditary in the [Xiu] family' by Spanish governors, and furthermore, kept their batabilo'ob offices (now as gobernadores or caciques), held special status as señores naturales, and often held special licences or commissions (eg to lead the native militia, or to bear arms). Similar concessions were afforded to the nobility of, and in some instances to non-noble office holders from, at least, Ah Canul, Ah Kin Chel, Ceh Pech, Chakan, Hocaba, Sotuta, and Tutul Xiu.

One such office, that of batab or alcalde, was further authorised by the parliament of British Honduras in the mid-nineteenth century, upon an influx of Maya refugees from the Caste War, and remains, as of 2022, an office in various village councils across Toledo, Belize.

Scholarly 

The earliest non-Maya attempt to 'reconstruct the political geography of the preconquest Maya' is credited to Diego de Landa's 1566 Relación de las cosas de Yucatán. However, it is rather Ralph Roys's 1957 Political Geography of the Yucatan Maya which, by the late twentieth century, became the 'most widely accepted reconstruction of the political geography of contact-period Yucatán.' However, by the 1980s, the state of knowledge in the field was still not considered settled, with several as-yet-open questions being deemed 'substantial,' and existing knowledge presenting 'a large number of contradictions.'

Scholars have customarily conceived of kuchkabalo'ob as 'territorial units in the traditional sense of kingdoms or provinces,' in keeping with sixteenth century Hispano-Maya thought. However, recent ethnohistorical literature, from the 2010s onwards, has argued 'that many of the pre-contact kingdoms [or provinces] described by [late 20th century] scholars like Ralph Roys and Peter Gerhard were in fact names for generalised [cultural or geographic] regions rather than polities, and that the kuchkabalo'ob were not territorial units per se [but rather noh kaho'ob or capital cities housing particularly pre-eminent ch'ibalo'ob or lineages, ie housing ch'ibalo'ob who held jurisdiction over neighbouring kaho'ob or settlements].' Consequently, as of 2022, competing senses of the term kuchkabal were employed in scholarly literature, ie the traditional kuchkabal-as-a-kingdom or -province, and the innovative kuchkabal-as-a-city. The former sense has been described as emphasising territorial extent or footprint, and the latter as emphasising networks or relations of authority.

Glossary

Table

Notes and references

Explanatory footnotes

Short citations

Full citations 

  
 
 
 
 
 
 
 
 
 
 
 
 
 
 
 
 
 
 
 
 
 
 
 
 
 

Maya civilization
Yucatán Peninsula